Luca di Paolo ( 1435 to 1441 - 1491) was an Italian painter mainly active in Matelica in the Marche region.

Life and career
The few details known of his life have only been collected in the 21st century. By 1455, he was an orphan under the care of his uncle. The 1460s polyptych of Ex-Pugin, a work that had found its way to the collection of Augustus Welby Pugin of Derby, England, is attributed to this artist. A panel from a larger polyptych, once attributed to Gentile da Fabriano, depicting St Catherine and St Michael Archangel once belonging to Sir George Sitwell has been attributed to Luca. A Crucifixion and Stories of the True Cross, attributed to Luca, once at the oratory of the Confraternity della Santa Croce, is now in display in the Museo Piersanti of Matelica. Finally a Madonna and Child in Glory with St Jerome and St Francis (1488) is on display in the Musée du Petit Palais of Avignon. He may or may not have had contact with Carlo Crivelli or Niccolò di Liberatore.

References

1430s births
1491 deaths
15th-century Italian painters
Italian male painters
Italian Renaissance painters
People from Matelica